Ilikhi Bolaghi (also Romanized as Īlīkhī Bolāghī; also known as Īlkh Bolāghī and Īlīkh) is a village in Qomrud Rural District, in the Central District of Qom County, Qom Province, Iran. At the 2006 census, its population was 53, in 14 families.

References 

Populated places in Qom Province